Eduardo De Cobos (born 20. August 1974) is a Spanish sport shooter and firearms instructor who took bronze in the Production division at the 2017 IPSC Handgun World Shoot in Châteauroux, France. He also has two gold and one bronze medal from the IPSC European Handgun Championships. Eduardo started shooting as a weekend activity with his father between 1990 and 1992. He had his breakthrough in 1997 taking his first IPSC Spanish Handgun Championship title, and today has over 15 Spanish Handgun titles. Eduardo placed 6th in the Production division at the 2008 IPSC Handgun World Shoot in Bali.

References

External links 
 Official Facebook Page of Eduardo de Cobos

Spanish male sport shooters
IPSC shooters
IPSC World Shoot Champions
1974 births
Living people
21st-century Spanish people